Empire Gaelic was a ferry which was built in 1945 for the Royal Navy as the Landing Ship Tank, Mk.3 HMS LST 3507. She was converted into a ferry in 1948 and renamed Empire Gaelic, serving on the Preston – Larne route 1949–60, when she was scrapped.

Description

The ship was propelled by a triple expansion steam engine. The engine was built by the Canadian Pacific Railway, Montreal, Quebec, Dominion of Canada. It drove twin screw propellers.

History
Landing Ship Tank, Mk.3 HMS LST 3507 was built in 1944 as yard number 562 by Davie Shipbuilding and Repairing Co. Ltd. Lauzon, Quebec for the Royal Navy. Ordered on 1 February 1944, she was launched on 28 October and commissioned on 15 May 1945. The Code Letters MAVR were allocated.

In 1948, LST 3507 was sold to the Atlantic Steam Navigation Company and converted to a ferry by Harland & Wolff, Govan. She entered service in January 1949 on the Preston – Larne route.

Empire Gaelic had been withdrawn from service by May 1960 and laid up in the Holy Loch, where she was offered for sale. She was scrapped in September in Burcht, Antwerp, Belgium.

References

External links
Photograph of Empire Gaelic at Larne

1944 ships
LST (3)-class tank landing ships
Ships built in Quebec
Empire ships
Merchant ships of the United Kingdom
Ferries of the United Kingdom
Steamships of the United Kingdom